The Secretary for Labour and Welfare of the Hong Kong Government is responsible for labour and social welfare policy in Hong Kong.  The position was created in 2007 to replace portions of the previous portfolio of Secretary for Economic Development and Labour and welfare portion from Secretary for Food and Health.

Labour affairs were handled by different ministers before the creation of this position:
 Secretary for Social Services before 1983;
 Secretary for Education and Manpower between 1983 and 2002;
 Secretary for Economic Development and Labour between 2002 and 2007.
Welfare affairs were included in the portfolio of:

 Secretary for Social Services before 1983;
 Secretary for Health and Welfare between 1983 and 2002;
 Secretary for Health, Welfare and Food between 2002 and 2007.

List of office holders
Political party:

References

External links
Secretary for Labour and Welfare
Organisation chart of Hong Kong Government

Labour and Welfare